Harold Putnam Williams (October 2, 1882 in Foxboro, Massachusetts – August 6, 1963) was an American attorney and judge who served as the United States Attorney for the District of Massachusetts from 1925 to 1926 and as an associate justice of the Massachusetts Supreme Judicial Court from 1947 to 1962.

Early life
Williams was born on October 2, 1882 in Foxboro, Massachusetts to Fred H. Williams, a lawyer and member of the Massachusetts General Court, and Julia Annette (Blake) Williams. Williams grew up in Foxboro and Brookline, Massachusetts. He graduated from Brookline High School in 1899, Harvard College in 1903, and Harvard Law School in 1906.

Attorney
Williams began his legal career as a lawyer with Walter I. Badger in Boston. He then went to work  with his father.

In 1918, Williams was appointed Assistant District Attorney for the Southeastern District (consisting of Norfolk and Plymouth Counties). In this role he assisted District Attorney Frederick G. Katzmann in the prosecution of Ferdinando Sacco and Bartolomeo Vanzetti. In 1922 he was elected District Attorney.

In December 1924 Williams was appointed United States Attorney for the District of Massachusetts by President Calvin Coolidge. Williams' appointment satisfied both Wets and dries as the drys felt that he would enforce the prohibition laws and the wets supported his confirmation because he was not endorsed by the Anti-Saloon League.

Judge
Williams resigned as U.S. Attorney in 1926 after he was appointed Associate Justice of the Massachusetts Superior Court. He remained on the Superior Court until August 13, 1947 when he was appointed by Governor Robert F. Bradford to serve on the Massachusetts Supreme Judicial Court.

Personal life
On September 9, 1911, Williams married Mary Harriet Culp of Brooklyn, Connecticut. They had one son, Harold P. Williams, Jr.

Williams served in many offices in Brookline including Town Moderator and member of the Board of Trustees of the Public Library.

Williams was a member of the Congregational church, the freemasons, the American Law Institute, the Massachusetts Bar Association, Sigma Alpha Epsilon, the Harvard Club of Boston, the Union Club of Boston, the Brae Burn Country Club, and the Grange.

Williams' hobbies included golf and traveling.

References

1882 births
1963 deaths
Harvard Law School alumni
Justices of the Massachusetts Supreme Judicial Court
People from Foxborough, Massachusetts
People from Brookline, Massachusetts
United States Attorneys for the District of Massachusetts
20th-century American judges
People from Millis, Massachusetts
Brookline High School alumni
Harvard College alumni